Neochori is a village in the Grevena municipality. Before the 2011 local government reform, it was a part of the municipality of Ventzio. The 2011 census recorded 116 residents in the village. Neochori is a part of the community of Sarakina.

See also
 List of settlements in the Grevena regional unit

References

Populated places in Grevena (regional unit)